Alpha Mapping is a technique in 3D computer graphics involving the use of texture mapping to designate the amount of transparency/translucency of areas in a certain object.

Alpha mapping is used when the given object's transparency is not consistent: when the transparency amount is not the same for the entire object and/or when the object is not entirely transparent. If the object has the same level of transparency everywhere, one can either use a solid-color alpha texture or an integer value.

The alpha map is often encoded in the alpha channel of an RGBA texture used for coloring instead of being a standalone greyscale texture.

See also
 Mask (computing)#Image masks

3D imaging
Texture mapping
Visual effects